Jon Kolko is the founder of Austin Center for Design, a progressive educational institution teaching interaction design and social entrepreneurship. He is also a partner at Modernist Studio.

Kolko has held the positions of Vice President of Design at Blackboard and at MyEdu; Executive Director of Design Strategy at Thinktiv, a startup accelerator in Austin, Texas; and both Principal Designer and Associate Creative Director roles at frog design, a global innovation firm. He was also a professor of interaction and industrial design at the Savannah College of Art and Design. Kolko has also held the role of Director for the Interaction Design Association (IxDA), and Editor-in-Chief of Interactions magazine, published by the ACM.

Kolko is the author of the following books:

 Thoughts on Interaction Design (Brown Bear Press, 2007; Morgan Kaufmann, 2011)
 Exposing the Magic of Design: A Practitioner's Guide to the Methods and Theory of Synthesis (Oxford University Press, 2011)
 Wicked Problems: Problems Worth Solving (Austin Center for Design, 2012)
 Well Designed: How to Use Empathy to Create Products People Love (Harvard Business Review Press, 2014)
 How I Teach (Brown Bear Press, 2017)
 Creative Clarity: A Practical Guide For Bringing Creative Thinking Into Your Company (Brown Bear Press, 2017)

References

External links
 
 
 How I Teach Design by Jon Kolko
 Wicked Problems: Problems Worth Solving by Jon Kolko

American industrial designers
American educators
Living people
1978 births